The  is a hot spring resort in Kanazawa, Ishikawa Prefecture, Japan.

History
As with several other hot spring resorts in the area, Yuwaku Onsen claims to have been founded in the Nara period by a paper-maker who followed an injured white heron and discovered that it was healing itself in the warm waters. This gives it a history of 1,300 years.

The onsen was developed by the Maeda clan of Kaga Domain in the Edo period. In the Meiji period, the painter Takehisa Yumeji was a visitor.

Geology
The hot spring is at an altitude of 400 meters above sea level at the foot of Mount Ioh. The water is slightly alkaline and contains gypsum. The mean temperature for the water is 32 °C.

Infrastructures
The area houses nine small hot spring inns.

Transportation
The hot spring is accessible by bus from Kanazawa Station of West Japan Railway Company.

See also
 Onsen

References

External links

  

Hot springs of Ishikawa Prefecture
Kanazawa
Tourist attractions in Ishikawa Prefecture
Spa towns in Japan